The Port of Leixões is one of Portugal's major seaports, located 4 km north of the mouth of the Douro River, in Matosinhos municipality, near the city of Porto.  Leixões Sport Club, commonly known simply as Leixões, is Matosinhos' sports club.

The Port of Leixões is the largest port infrastructure in the Northern Region of Portugal and one of the most important in the Country.

History 
The Port of Leixões was built at the end of the 19th century and successively extended and improved to the present day.

References 

Ports and harbours of Portugal
Matosinhos